Wanda Guenette (born August 31, 1962 in Winnipeg, Manitoba) is a retired female volleyball player from Canada, who competed at the 1996 Summer Olympics in Atlanta, Georgia. There she ended up in tenth place with the Women's National Team. Later on Guenette started a career in beach volleyball and competed at the 2003 Pan American Games.

References
 Canadian Olympic Committee

1962 births
Living people
Canadian women's volleyball players
Canadian women's beach volleyball players
Volleyball players at the 1996 Summer Olympics
Olympic volleyball players of Canada
Beach volleyball players at the 2003 Pan American Games
Volleyball players from Winnipeg
Pan American Games bronze medalists for Canada
Pan American Games medalists in volleyball
Medalists at the 1995 Pan American Games